The Treaty of Paris was signed on March 6, 1323. It established clarity over the following: Count Louis I of Flanders relinquished Flemish claims over the County of Zeeland and acknowledged the Count of Holland, William I, as the Count of Zeeland. William, in turn, agreed to renounce all claims on Flanders.

Bibliography

See also
List of treaties

References

Paris 1323
Paris
Paris (1323)
1323 in Europe
1320s in France
Medieval Paris
History of Zeeland
14th century in Paris
14th century in the county of Flanders
14th century in the Netherlands